Gibberula maldiviana is a species of sea snail, a marine gastropod mollusk, in the family Cystiscidae.

Distribution
This species occurs in Maldives.

References

maldiviana
Gastropods described in 2001